A vineyard track is a term used in the legislature of the Czech Republic, meaning a site suitable for vineyards growing.

Definition 
By definition of the law no. 321/2004 of the Czech Republic, a vineyard track is an agricultural estate, part of an estate, set of estates, ensemble of an estate and a part of an estate or combination of estates, or parts of estate(s), representing a coherent complex/set within one vine-growing region (or sub-region), that is suitable for growing of vine due to its geographical location, incline, length of insolation and soil-climatical properties.

The term 
The term trať in the winemaking industry (that is a synonym for the English word "track"), primarily used in Czech as a term for 'railroad track', does not have anything to do with railway transportation at all, except for its default meaning.

Default meaning 
The originating meaning 'railway track' (with the common meaning in Czech 'railroad section (a sub-set of rails) of the entire railway system specified in the timetable/schedule, having its own ID number, usually belonging to a specifically delimited (coherent) area, typically between a major railway junction where the track starts and a city/village, where the track ends in the last station/terminal, or a track interconnecting two major junctions to cover the settlements in between') is being used in the very same way for the description of a sub-set of vineyards.

Origin 
In Czech countries, this usage of the word owes its origin most probably to the fact, that the most typical vine-training in Czech Republic is being aided by using trellising, visually resembling (railway) "tracks" that belong together (form a coherent complex).

Other countries 
German – Germany: the most equivalent term is Einzellage.
German – Austria: The term is Riede.
English/French: the most equivalent term is "Terroir", which however might have much broader meaning, not matching the originating definition.

References 

Agriculture in the Czech Republic
Law of the Czech Republic
Viticulture